The 6 Metre was a sailing event on the Sailing at the 1912 Summer Olympics program in Nynäshamn.  Two races were scheduled plus eventual sail-offs. 18 sailors, on 6 boats, from 5 nations entered.

Race schedule

Course area and course configuration 
For the 6-Metre Course B was used.

Weather conditions

Final results 
The 1912 Olympic scoring system was used. All competitors were male.

Daily standings

Notes 
In the 6 Metre there was a 'No show' of three boats:

Other information

Prizes 

 The following Commemorative Plaque were handed out by the Royal Swedish Yacht Club to the owners of:

 Challenge Cup (vase) of the French Government to the owners of: Mac Miche: Gaston Thubé & G. Fitau

Further reading 
 
"Olympics, 1912". International Six Metre Archive. Retrieved 25 January 2021.

References 

Sailing at the 1912 Summer Olympics
6 Metre (keelboat)